Dawa Yangzum Sherpa also known as Dawa Yangzum is a Nepali born  mountain climber and the first woman to become an international mountain guide from Nepal.

Life
Dawa Yangzum started her professional mountain climbing in 2009 with Yala Peak marking her first summit. She has climbed five of the fourteen 8000ers so far. She became one of the iconic Nepali mountain climbers in the history after climbing the Mount Everest in 2012. In 2017, she received a certification from the International Federation of Mountain Guides Association and qualified to become an international mountain guide in the same year.
In March 2019, she signed a professional agreement with a US outdoor recreation product company, making her one of the few professional Nepali mountaineers to be paid as an athlete by a major western company.

Dawa Yangzum has climbed Everest several times and she became the first female Nepali woman to summit the fifth highest peak Makalu on 29 May 2019. On 26 July 2014, she was part of the all female 3-member Nepali contingent to summit K2. The other prominent members were Pasang Lhamu Sherpa Akita and Maya Sherpa.She also became the first woman to reach the true summit of Manaslu in autumn 2021.

References 

Living people
Nepalese mountain climbers
Nepalese summiters of Mount Everest
Sherpa summiters of Mount Everest
1990 births
Nepalese female mountain climbers
People from Dolakha District